Bellvale is a populated place in San Mateo County, located at . The small community is on Highway 84 (La Honda Road) between San Gregorio and La Honda. Bellvale has an elevation of 240 feet above sea level.  Although Bellvale once had a post office, the community is now only sparsely settled with homes and farms.  The Bellvale post office, located 2.25 miles west of La Honda, opened in 1897 and was discontinued in 1922.  U.S. Geological Survey maps show oil wells in the area, tapping a relatively small pool of petroleum that was first identified in the nineteenth century.

References

Populated coastal places in California
Unincorporated communities in San Mateo County, California
Unincorporated communities in California